"Bésame Mucho" ("Kiss Me A Lot") is a bolero song written in 1940 by Mexican songwriter Consuelo Velázquez. It is one of the most popular songs of the 20th century and one of the most important songs in the history of Latin music. It was recognized in 1999 as the most recorded and covered song in Spanish of all time. Famous versions were sung by Trio Los Panchos and female vocalist Gigliola Cinquetti in 1968, and by Dalida in 1976. English lyrics to it were written by Sunny Skylar.

The song appeared in the film Follow the Boys (May 5, 1944) when it was played by Charlie Spivak and his Orchestra and in Cowboy and the Senorita (May 13, 1944) with vocal by Dale Evans.

Inspiration
According to Velázquez herself, she wrote this song even though she had never been kissed yet at the time, and kissing, as she heard, was considered a sin.

She was inspired by the piano piece "Quejas, o la Maja y el Ruiseñor", from the 1911 suite Goyescas by Spanish composer Enrique Granados, which he later also included as "Aria of the Nightingale" in his 1916 opera of the same name.

In politics

In 1990, a hitherto clandestine affair between two Brazilian government ministers, Bernardo Cabral (Minister of Justice) and Zélia Cardoso de Mello (Minister for Economy, Finance & Planning), was revealed to public knowledge as the couple danced cheek to cheek to "Bésame Mucho" during a birthday party held for Cardoso de Mello. A married father of three, Cabral was forced to resign as a result.

A few days later, at a ceremony in which Cardoso de Mello was due to receive her country's Order of Military Merit, the regimental band of the presidential guard, Os Dragões da Independência, struck up "Bésame Mucho" as she was presented with her medal. Its musical director, Lt. Geraldo Mendonça da Lima, was subsequently given 3 days' detention for insubordination.

Notable versions

 Bob Eberly and Kitty Kallen with Jimmy Dorsey & His Orchestra (reached number one in the United States in 1944)
 Andy Russell (reached No. 8 in the USA in 1944)
 Bing Crosby (recorded in 1975 and featured on the 1977 album Bingo Viejo)
 Frank Sinatra had a U.S. top 10 hit in 1954.
 The Coasters hit the Hot 100 with their version, which peaked at No. 70, in 1960.
 The Beatles (recorded during their Decca audition on January 1, 1962.  A second version was recorded during their first session at Abbey Road Studios on June 6, 1962.  The latter is included on The Beatles' Anthology 1)
 Plácido Domingo (received a Grammy nomination for Best Latin Pop Performance in 1983)
 Pedro Vargas (inducted into the Latin Grammy Hall of Fame in 2001)
 Bobby Sanabria's Big Band received a Grammy nomination for Best Latin Jazz Recording in 2007 for their album, Big Band Urban Folktales, which included a jazz bolero version of Besame Mucho sung by Hiram "El Pavo"Remón
 Zoé (nominated for a Latin Grammy for Record of the Year in 2012)

References
in the film Adua e le Compagne at 21.28min in youtube version.

External links

Performances in Spanish
 
 
 

Songs about kissing
1940 songs
1944 singles
Songs written by Sunny Skylar
Song recordings produced by George Martin
The Beatles songs
The Coasters songs
Luis Miguel songs
Number-one singles in the United States
Pop standards
World music songs
Spanish-language songs
Jazz compositions in C minor
Boleros
Latin Grammy Hall of Fame Award recipients
RCA Records singles
Songs written by Consuelo Velázquez